Hoël Carlos Pattisson (5 September 1905 – 10 July 1979) was an English cricketer who made one appearance in first-class cricket in 1937.

Educated at Rugby School, Pattisson made his only appearance in first-class cricket in 1937 when he was selected to play for the Free Foresters against Oxford University at the Oxford. He played as a wicket-keeper in the match, as well as captaining the team. He was dismissed bowled by Randle Darwall-Smith without scoring in the Free Foresters first-innings, while in their second-innings he scored 20 runs before being bowled by Bill Murray-Wood. Oxford University won the match by 10 wickets.

He died at Playden, Sussex on 10 July 1979.

References

External links
Hoël Pattisson at ESPNcricinfo
Hoël Pattisson at CricketArchive

1905 births
1979 deaths
People from West Byfleet
People educated at Rugby School
English cricketers
Free Foresters cricketers
People from Rother District